The Mihajlović family house is situated in Obrenovac, in 182 Miloša Obrenovića Street. The settlement Obrenovac was mentioned for the first time in the historical sources under the name Palež, in 1718, in the Austrian state register of the Valjevo District, as a settlement consisted of eleven households. The archaeological findings show that the settlement was much older than that and that it dates back from the period of the Roman Empire. Due to its economical, administrative and educational and cultural importance, in 1859, in the honour of the return of Miloš Obrenović to Serbia, the settlement obtained the status of a town and a new name – Obrenovac.

History 
It is already known that it has existed since the beginning of the nineteenth century, yet, there are no exact data on the very year of the construction. However, there are some information that Serbian writer Joakim Vujić  left to us indirectly, through his records on his journey through Serbia in 1826. While going through Obrenovac Vujić noticed the following: “After arriving here to spend the night, I came to Mr Dimitrije Mihajlović, who politely and joyfully admitted me to his honourable home, and then offered me dinner and coffee“, so it can be concluded that the house was already built in 1826.

Mihajlović`s family house was, at the time, a monumental house with business-residential purpose. A strong merchandise tradition in Palež of that time maintained in preserving the Serbian merchant class in the time of economic stagnation of Belgrade pashadom at the end of the 18th century and the beginning of the 19th century. The proof that it was really a Serbian house, and not the one bought or inherited from the Turks, is found in data mentioned in Joakim Vujić`s book, that in the Palež settlement in 1826 there are "60 Serbian houses and not a single Turkish one".

The house appearance 
The base of the house is of an elongated rectangle, with two-gabled roof. The house consists of the ground floor, first floor and a basement, which is located under one part of the object. The house was built with wooden post and petrail, with brick filling. The roof consists of the construction made of wooden rafters and beams and the pepper tile roofing. The roof is two-gabled. The spatial organization is developed according to the linear scheme with the prolonged division of the rooms in line. There are three mutually connected rooms from the central isle in the eastern part of the house, where the workshops were placed. From the central isle to the west there is a bigger room, with the street view. This room is connected with the smaller pantry, which the trade family used in their business. In the backyard, from the central isle to the east, there are two bigger rooms, mutually connected, and to the west there is a small hall and one room. All the rooms in the courtyard area were intended for the residence.[3] Upstairs, there are three big rooms from the front side, which are mutually connected, and in the courtyard there is a large porch, on the either side of which there is one room, intended for residence. The front street facade is flat and done in mortar. There was an architrave porch on the east side of the ground floor, which is now closed. On the facade there is a characteristic horizontal wrath with low relief profiles. The windows are in a row. There are fillings, or filunge and overlay locks on the doors. The exception are the doors upstairs, which are done with „incrusted“ filunges. The floors are, depending on the purpose, made of bricks or wood. The chimneys were walled up. The special quality of this house is the fact that in terms of the general architectural concept it represents the symbiosis of the oriental Turkish and European perceptions in residential architecture. Despite the new scheme, one of the most important values of Turkish oriental architecture remained in the house – the harmony between the inner and outer world, achieved through large open porches both on the ground floor and upstairs.

Reconstructions and the present condition 
At the beginning of the 1970s many works were done on the reconstruction of the building, after which the Library Vlada Aksentijević was placed in the house, and remained there to this day.

Cultural heritage 
Numerous, undeniable qualities of the Mihajlović`s family house in Obrenovac, as the functional, constructive and aesthetic achievement of our national architecture, make this object one of the most valuable monuments on the territory of the City of Belgrade. Due to all above mentioned, the Mihajlović`s family house was declared for the cultural monument  in 1970, and for the cultural heritage of a great importance in 1979. After the reconstruction, at the beginning of the 1970s, the library was placed in the house, and remained there to this day.

See also 
 Obrenovac
 Joakim Vujić

References

External links 

 Institute for the Protection of Cultural Monuments - Belgrade
 List of monuments

Houses in Serbia
Cultural Monuments of Great Importance (Serbia)
Principality of Serbia